TCPware is a third party layered product published by "Process Software LLC" to add TCP/IP capabilities to OpenVMS. The need for such a product may seem obvious today but back in the early 1990s Digital Equipment Corporation (who published VAX/VMS as it was known at the time) had an internal policy favoring their own product called DECnet. Meanwhile, many VMS users in governments, large corporations and universities were discovering the "TCP/IP based" internet and required third party software to enable connectivity to it.

Today, VSI's "TCPIP Services for OpenVMS" is putting pressure on products like TCPware. One reason TCPware has not faded from use is two TCPware APIs called "the Telnet Library" and "the FTP Library". These modules allow a relatively inexperienced programmer to use a high level language to write software which will connect across the internet and do useful work. Also, quite a bit of legacy software now relies on these modules with no good reason to rewrite them at the lower "packet library" level.

In the early 1990s, DEC produced its own version of UNIX called ULTRIX which supported TCP/IP. Almost as a skunk works project, it produced a layered product for VMS called UCX (Ultrix Communications Extensions) which later evolved into "TCPIP Services for OpenVMS".

TCPware's "Telnet Library" can be used for other protocol transfers like HTTP and SMTP.

External links
 www.process.com

Internet protocols
OpenVMS software